Two-time defending champion Martina Hingis defeated Amélie Mauresmo in the final, 6–2, 6–3 to win the women's singles tennis title at the 1999 Australian Open. With the win, she joined Margaret Court, Evonne Goolagong, Steffi Graf, and Monica Seles as the only women to win three consecutive Australian Open titles. Hingis also became the only woman to win three consecutive Australian Open titles in singles and doubles simultaneously.

This tournament marked future world No. 1 Mauresmo's first major final, and the first time she progressed past the third round of a major. It would be her only major final until 2006, despite being one of the top players of the early 2000s.

Prior to her semifinal defeat to Hingis, Seles was undefeated in 33 matches at the Australian Open, dating back to her tournament debut in 1991, the longest undefeated winning streak at one tournament by a woman in the Open Era.

This was the last Australian Open appearance for four-time champion Steffi Graf, who was defeated by Monica Seles in the quarterfinals.

Seeds

Qualifying draw

Draw

Finals

Top half

Section 1

Section 2

Section 3

Section 4

Bottom half

Section 5

Section 6

Section 7

Section 8

References

External links
 1999 Australian Open – Women's draws and results at the International Tennis Federation

Women's singles
Australian Open (tennis) by year – Women's singles
1999 in Australian women's sport